Admiral Sir Robert Henry More-Molyneux,  (7 August 1838 – 29 February 1904) was a Royal Navy officer who became President of the Royal Naval College, Greenwich.

Naval career
After an education at Windlesham House School, More-Molyneux joined the Royal Navy in 1852 and served in the Black Sea during the Crimean War. 
He became Commanding Officer of the training ship HMS St Vincent in 1869, Commanding Officer of the corvette HMS Ruby in 1877 (in which he served during the Russo-Turkish War) and then Commanding Officer of the battleship HMS Invincible, flagship of Vice Admiral Sir Beauchamp Seymour, in 1880.

After commanding the Invincible during the bombardment of Alexandria in 1882 during the Anglo-Egyptian War, he went on to be commodore commanding the ships in the Red Sea in 1884, captain-superintendent of Sheerness Dockyard in 1886 and admiral-superintendent at Devonport in 1891. After that he became President of the Royal Naval College, Greenwich in 1900 before retiring in 1903.

He was promoted to a Knight Grand Cross of the Order of the Bath (GCB) in the November 1902 Birthday Honours list, and invested with the insignia by King Edward VII at Buckingham Palace on 18 December 1902.

Family
In 1874, he married Annie Mary Carew, daughter of Captain Matthew Charles Forster, R.N. ; she died in 1898, leaving a daughter, Gwendolen.

References

External links
Audacious Class Ironclads

1838 births
1904 deaths
Royal Navy admirals
Knights Grand Cross of the Order of the Bath
Admiral presidents of the Royal Naval College, Greenwich
People educated at Windlesham House School